This is a list of public elementary schools in New York City. They are typically referred to as "PS number" (e.g. "PS 46"). Many PS numbers are ambiguous, being used by more than one school. The sections correspond to New York City DOE Regions. Some charter schools are included throughout this list; others may be added to the charter schools section at the end of the list.

Manhattan

Older classifications

Region 1: The Bronx

Region 2: The Bronx

Region 3: Queens

Region 4: Queens

Region 5: Brooklyn, Queens

Region 6: Brooklyn

Region 7: Staten Island, Brooklyn

Region 8: Brooklyn

Region 9: Manhattan, the Bronx

Region 10: Manhattan, the Bronx

Empowerment Schools: citywide

Special Education District 75: citywide

Charter schools: citywide

Glossary

In some of the literature issued by the New York City Board of Education there may be a letter or a string of two letters which may be before or after the School Number.

Boroughs: The City of New York comprises five geographic sections called "boroughs." Schools that are part of Community School Districts, High Schools, and Specialized Superintendencies all receive a borough designation as follows: 

K = Brooklyn (Kings County)
M = Manhattan 
Q = Queens 
R = Staten Island (Richmond County)
X = Bronx. 

School Levels:  
E = Elementary,  
I = J.H.S, Middle & Intermediate, 
H = High School. 

Instructional Leadership Division:  
Division 1 - Bronx (BX)  
Division 2 - Bronx (BX)   
Division 3 - Queens (QNS)  
Division 4 - Queens (QNS)  
Division 5 - Queens (QNS) & Brooklyn (BK)  
Division 6 - Brooklyn (BK)  
Division 7 - Brooklyn (BK) & Staten Island (SI)  
Division 8 - Brooklyn (BK)  
Division 9 - Manhattan (M) & Bronx (BX)  
Division 10 - Manhattan (M)

See also
 Education in New York City
 New Explorations into Science, Technology and Math
 Empowerment School

References

External links

 
New York City
New York City-related lists